The Uganda Police Force is the national police force of Uganda. The head of the force is called the Inspector General of Police (IGP). The current IGP is Martin Okoth Ochola.  Ochola replaced former IGP, General Kale Kayihura in March 2018. Recruitment to the forces is done annually.

History
The Uganda Police Force was established in 1906 by the British administration. At that time, it was referred to as the Uganda Armed Constabulary with the primary responsibility of quelling "riots and unrest."

On 25 May 1906, then Captain (later Brigadier General) William F.S Edwards, DSO, arrived in Uganda and became the first Inspector General of the Uganda Protectorate Police. Brigadier General William FS Edwards was regarded as a "stern disciplinarian and an excellent administrator." He held the IGP appointment until 1908, but held a position in administration up to the time of his retirement in 1922.

The size of the force was reduced from 8,000 to 3,000 in 1986. Up until April 2014, the official name of the government agency was Uganda Police Force. On that day, the IGP publicly announced the name change to Uganda National Police.

Equipment

In 2015, the police agency took delivery of three new aircraft, including one PZL W-3A Sokół helicopter; one AgustaWestland AW109 GrandNew helicopter; and one fixed wing aircraft.

Firearms
 Jericho 941- counter-terrorism officers
 Remington 870 12 Gauge
 AK-47 7.62x39mm
 Federal Riot Gun- Deployed by riot police

Notable people
Below are some notable people who have served in the Uganda National Police:
Joshua Cheptegei - Olympian long-distance runner
Luke Kercan Ofungi - Long serving former IGP
General Edward Katumba Wamala - First Ugandan military officer to serve as Inspector General

Below are some notable people who have served in the original Uganda Protectorate Police, Uganda Police and British East Africa Police:
Brigadier General William FS Edwards - first Inspector General of the Uganda Protectorate Police, first IG of the Uganda Police and the IG of then British East Africa Police.

See also 
 Crime in Uganda

References

External links
Official website
Uganda Police Rebrands
 Force Starts Rebranding Campaign
 U.S. Donates Aircraft to UPDF

Law enforcement in Uganda
1900s establishments in Uganda